Pythopolis was a town of ancient Mysia or of ancient Bithynia. It was a colony of Athens.

Pythopolis was a member if the Delian League, appearing in a tribute decree of Athens of 422/1 BCE.

Its site is located near modern M Sölöz, Turkey.

References

Populated places in ancient Mysia
Populated places in Bithynia
Former populated places in Turkey
Members of the Delian League